Pertiwi is an Indonesian surname. Notable people with the surname include:

Elfin Pertiwi Rappa (born 1995), Indonesian beauty pageant titleholder 
Indah Dewi Pertiwi (born 1991), Indonesian singer, dancer, and artist 

Indonesian-language surnames